Soup is a children's claymation-style animated television series made in New Zealand which aired on TVNZ in 2002. It was created by Jamie Canard and ran for three series of 10 episodes each within the What Now children's TV programme. Each episode was around five minutes long and portrayed the lives of fictional creatures living in a swamp. The style of the series was inspired by The Trap Door, with a variety of creatures ranging from hideous rampaging monsters to small scuttling things, typically with big eyes on top of their heads.

Characters
Roger Lizard, who sometimes provides background information to the story and seems to look after the going-ons in the swamp. He has a book containing an illustrated list of the hideous beasts inhabiting the swamp, which he uses as reference when identifying creatures.
Bronwyn and Flip, the main characters.
Policeslug Nigel, a police officer in the form of a snail.
Roland, a pink creature with a single hand atop one stout leg. The hand which carries its single big eye.
A starfish-like creature with a name that sounds like a popping sound.

The only regularly appearing talking creatures are Roger, Bronwyn, Flip and Policeslug Nigel. Roland appears in several episodes, but talks in an unintelligible language.

Creatures
Talking creatures:
Two snails who deliver messages, typically between Roger and Policeslug Nigel.
Two Grizzlefish, which prey on almost every other creature in the swamp, except the Bobfiend of which they are afraid.
The Bobfiend, who likes to scare the Grizzlefish, but is otherwise quite harmless.

The swamp is also inhabited by a variety of non-talking creatures, some of which are named:
Frog Monster
Giant Jellymonster - afraid of snails, although it does not talk as such, in one episode it sings a somewhat comprehensible lullaby to Roland.
Shrieking Crab - uses freaky moss as decoration of its shell
Speeding Rocket Beetle
Spotted Scaredy Menace
Strobe - emits a blinking light when touched

Flora
The following is a list of named plants and fungi in the swamp:
Delicipod
Exploding Fruit
Freaky Moss

Original episodes
Season 1:

 The Strobes
 Grizzlefish
 Traffic Jam
 Mud Day
 The Games
 Song of the Banded Warbler
 Roland Gets Robbed
 Murky Depths
 Legend of the Bogfiend
 The Flatworms

Season 2:

 To Catch A Newt
 Fist of Orange
 Roger's String
 The Lost Egg
 Sports Day
 The Gap
 Skidplums
 Return to the Murky Depths
 Escape from the Murky Depths
 Freaky Moss

Season 3:

 Queen of the Hill
 A Daring Plan
 One Smart Frog
 Bronwyn's Potion
 Nature Ramble
 Slimey Justice
 Mudmonster vs Behemoth
 The Other Five Senses
 Spelunkers
 The Wide Piper

Season 1's ten episodes were available for sale for a short time on a single VHS video through Whitcoulls in New Zealand.

Stop-motion animated television series
New Zealand children's animated television series
2002 New Zealand television series debuts
2002 New Zealand television series endings
TVNZ original programming